Two ships of the Japanese Navy have been named Okinoshima:

  was previously the Russian coast defense ship General-Admiral Apraksin launched in 1866 and renamed on capture by Japan in 1905. She was stricken in 1922.
  was a minelayer launched in 1935 and sunk in 1942

Japanese Navy ship names
Imperial Japanese Navy ship names